Paul Lukas (born Pál Lukács; 26 May 1894 – 15 August 1971) was a Hungarian actor. He won the Academy Award for Best Actor, and the first Golden Globe Award for Best Actor – Motion Picture Drama for his performance in the film Watch on the Rhine (1943), reprising the role he created on the Broadway stage.

Biography
Lukas was born Pál Lukács in Budapest into a Hungarian-Jewish family, the son of Adolf Munkácsi and Mária Schneckendorf. He was later adopted by Mária (née Zilahy) and János Lukács, an advertising executive.

Lukas made his stage debut in Budapest in 1916 and his film debut in 1917. At first, he played elegant, smooth womanizers, but increasingly he became typecast as a villain. He had a successful stage and film career in Hungary, Germany, and Austria, where he worked with Max Reinhardt. He arrived in Hollywood in 1927 and became a naturalized citizen of the United States in 1937. In 1935 he built a home near the new Racquet Club of Palm Springs, California.

He was busy in the 1930s, appearing in such films as the melodrama Rockabye, the crime caper Grumpy, Alfred Hitchcock's The Lady Vanishes, the comedy Ladies in Love, and the drama Dodsworth. He followed William Powell and Basil Rathbone portraying the series detective Philo Vance, a cosmopolitan New Yorker, once in The Casino Murder Case (1935).

His major film success came in Watch on the Rhine (1943), where he played a man working against the Nazis, a role he originated in the Broadway premiere of the play of the same name in 1941. His portrayal of Kurt Mueller, a German émigré with an American wife, played by Bette Davis, was universally lauded by critics. Brooks Atkinson of the New York Times, wrote, "As the enemy of fascism, Mr. Lukas' haggard, loving, resourceful determination becomes heroic by virtue of his sincerity and his superior abilities as an actor." He won the Academy Award for Best Actor for the role. He also received the New York Film Critics Award for his performance.

In 1943, he guest starred as the lead character in an episode of the radio program Suspense, "Mr. Markham, Antique Dealer", as well as the character of a blind composer in the episode "A World of Darkness". On 2 April 1944, he starred in "The Steadfast Heart" on Silver Theater.
In the 1940s, Lukas was a charter member of the Motion Picture Alliance for the Preservation of American Ideals, a conservative lobbying group opposed to possible Communist influence in Hollywood.

Lukas also starred as Professor Aronnax in Walt Disney's film version of Jules Verne's 20,000 Leagues Under the Sea (1954).

Lukas' film career continued into the 1960s with nine films, including Fun in Acapulco with Elvis Presley in 1963 and Lord Jim with Peter O'Toole in 1965. His final film, The Challenge, was released in 1970.

The remainder of his career moved from Hollywood to the stage to television. His only singing role was as Cosmo Constantine in the original 1950 Broadway stage version of Irving Berlin's Call Me Madam, opposite Ethel Merman for over 600 performances (although he is heard singing a song in the 1933 film Little Women).

Lukas died 15 August 1971, in Tangier, Morocco, reportedly while searching for a place to spend his retirement years. He is buried in Spain.

Recognition
Lukas was honored with a star on the Hollywood Walk of Fame at 6821 Hollywood Boulevard on February 8, 1960.

Filmography

See also
 List of actors with Academy Award nominations

References

External links

 
 
 
 Paul Lukas at Virtual History

1894 births
1971 deaths
20th-century Hungarian male actors
20th-century American male actors
20th-century American Jews
Actors from Palm Springs, California
American people of Hungarian-Jewish descent
Austro-Hungarian Jews
Best Actor Academy Award winners
Best Drama Actor Golden Globe (film) winners
Hungarian emigrants to the United States
Hungarian male silent film actors
Jewish American male actors
Jewish Hungarian actors
Male actors from Budapest